Medeho is a town in the northeastern Obock Region of Djibouti. Medeho has one of the mildest climates in Djibouti, which is not always passable during the rainy season. The town is overlooked by Mabla Mountains, the fifth tallest mountain in Djibouti. As of 2016, the population of Medeho has been estimated to be 4,000.

Overview
Nearby towns and villages include Tadjoura (42 km) and Obock (39 km).

Climate
Medeho has a hot semi-arid climate (BSh) in Köppen-Geiger system, with the influence of mountain climate.

References

External links
Satellite map at Maplandia.com

Populated places in Djibouti